The Folklore Museum is a generic title for a museum of social history, and less often of folklore in the mythic sense. There are many around the world.

Greece
 Folklore Museum of the Aristotle Association
 Folklore Museum of Afytos
 Folklore Museum of Kastoria
 Folklore Museum of Komotini
 Folklore Museum of Limenaria
 Folklore Museum of Velventos
 Folklore Museum of Veroia

India 
 Folklore Museum (Mysuru)
 Loktak Folklore Museum

Jordan
 Jordan Folklore Museum

Malta
 Gran Castello Historic House, formerly the Folklore Museum